Cerithiopsida is a genus of sea snails in the family Newtoniellidae.

Some species are also represented in the fossil record.

Species
 Cerithiopsida diegensis (Bartsch, 1911) (type)
 Cerithiopsida echinata (Golikov & Gulbin, 1978)
 Cerithiopsida elegans (Golikov & Gulbin, 1978)
 Cerithiopsida lata (Golikov & Gulbin, 1978)
 Cerithiopsida rowelli (Bartsch, 1911)

References

External links 

 Cerithiopsida at the World Register of Marine Species (WoRMS)

Ptenoglossa
Gastropod genera